The Apostolic Vicariate (or Vicariate Apostolic) of Tucupita is a missionary circonscription of the Roman Catholic Church in Venezuela.

It is exempt, i.e. directly dependent on the Holy See, not part of any ecclesiastical province. Its cathedral see is located in Tucupita, the city capital of Venezuela's Atlantic-coastal Delta Amacuro state.

History 
On 30 July 1954, Pope Pius XII established the Apostolic Vicariate of Tucupita from territory taken from the Apostolic Vicariate of Caroní.

Incumbent Ordinaries 
Note: so far, all its Apostolic Vicars were Capucins (O.F.M. Cap.) and titular bishops
 Argimiro Alvaro García Rodríguez, O.F.M. Cap. † (19 Dec. 1955 – 25 Nov. 1985)
 Felipe González González, O.F.M. Cap. (25 Nov. 1985 – 26 May 2014)
 Ernesto José Romero Rivas, O.F.M. Cap. (7 April 2015 – present)

See also 
 Roman Catholicism in Venezuela

Sources and References

External links 
 GigaCatholic, with extensive biographies of incumbents

Apostolic vicariates
Roman Catholic dioceses in Venezuela
Christian organizations established in 1954
1954 establishments in Venezuela
Tucupita